SaferVPN was a VPN service developed by Safer Social, Ltd.

History
SaferVPN was released in 2013 by Amit Bareket and Sagi Gidali. SaferVPN network infrastructure served as the basis of Barekets' and Gidalis' next company, Perimeter 81.

The service was acquired by J2 Global in 2019 Q3 and was eventually merged into StrongVPN.

Technology
SaferVPN utilized the protocols OpenVPN, PPTP, L2TP and IKEv2.

See also 
 Comparison of virtual private network services

References 

Virtual private network services